Yolani Fourie (born 12 October 1989) is a South African cricketer who currently plays for Central Gauteng. She plays as a right-arm off break bowler. She appeared in one Test match, 15 One Day Internationals and 10 Twenty20 Internationals for South Africa between 2014 and 2018. In November 2018, she was added to South Africa's squad for the 2018 ICC Women's World Twenty20 tournament in the West Indies.

In September 2019, she was named in the F van der Merwe XI squad for the inaugural edition of the Women's T20 Super League in South Africa.

References

External links
 
 

1989 births
Living people
Cricketers from Cape Town
South African women cricketers
South Africa women Test cricketers
South Africa women One Day International cricketers
South Africa women Twenty20 International cricketers
Western Province women cricketers
Central Gauteng women cricketers
20th-century South African women
21st-century South African women